Iinijärvi is a lake. It is located in Päijänne Tavastia, in the area of Kärkölä municipality, in the Southern Finland region in Finland. It is 200 m long and its width is 100 m.

References

Lakes of Kärkölä